Pimpernel Svensson is a 1950 Swedish comedy film directed by Emil A. Lingheim and starring Edvard Persson, Ivar Wahlgren and Aurore Palmgren. It was made at the Stockholm studios of Europa Film and on location in Skåne. Arne Åkermark was its art director.

Synopsis
In an updating of The Scarlet Pimpernel, a Swede travels to Stettin in 1945 to rescue his nephew who has been trapped in the Soviet-occupied port.

Cast
 Edvard Persson as Anders 'Pimpernel' Svensson  
 Ivar Wahlgren as Ville Lundgren 
 Aurore Palmgren as Willy's Mother  
 Gunnel Wadner as Willy's Wife  
 Arne Wirén as General Badajsky  
 Rodja Persidsky as Major Pusjkin  
 Algot Larsson as August Andersson  
 Signe Wirff as Refugee  
 Ove Flodin as Pålson  
 John Degerberg as Bell-ringer  
 Walter Sarmell as Station Master 
 Frans Begger as Russian Soldier  
 Svea Holst as Pimpernel's Maid  
 Minna Larsson as Karla Andersson 
 Inger Sotnikov as Girl in Stettin  
 Mikael Sotnikov as Schultze  
 Maj-Britt Thörn as Prostitute

References

Bibliography 
 Qvist, Per Olov & von Bagh, Peter. Guide to the Cinema of Sweden and Finland. Greenwood Publishing Group, 2000.

External links 
 

1950 films
1950 comedy films
Swedish comedy films
1950s Swedish-language films
Films directed by Emil A. Lingheim
Swedish black-and-white films
1950s Swedish films